The 1960 Toledo Rockets football team was an American football team that represented Toledo University in the Mid-American Conference (MAC) during the 1960 NCAA University Division football season. In their first season under head coach Clive Rush, the Rockets compiled a 2–7 record (0–6 against MAC opponents) and finished in seventh place in the MAC.

The team's statistical leaders included Jerry Stoltz with 277 passing yards, John Murray with 608 rushing yards, and Bob Smith with 268 receiving yards.

Schedule

References

Toledo
Toledo Rockets football seasons
Toledo Rockets football